The New Jersey Division of Fish and Wildlife is a government agency in the U.S. state of New Jersey overseen by the cabinet-level New Jersey Department of Environmental Protection (NJDEP). The division is "dedicated to the protection, management and wise use of New Jersey's fish and wildlife resources". The division issues licenses, stamps and permits for hunting, fishing and trapping and the proceeds from such sales directly fund the division's operations, specifically includes the operation of two fish hatcheries and associated stocking programs, a pheasant farm, enforcement of fish and wildlife regulations, habitat protection, fish and wildlife research, wildlife management area maintenance and improvement, education, and other programs and activities".

Divisions

The division's duties are divided into several administrative bureaus, including:
 Bureau of Freshwater Fisheries 
 Bureau of Land Management
 Bureau of Law Enforcement
 Bureau of Marine Fisheries
 Bureau of Shellfisheries
 Bureau of Wildlife Management 
 Bureau of Information and Education
 Bureau of Fisheries Production 
 Endangered and Nongame Species Program
 Office of Administration
 Office of Environmental Review 
 Office of Fish and Wildlife Health and Forensics

See also
List of law enforcement agencies in New Jersey
List of State Fish and Wildlife Management Agencies in the U.S.

References

External links
 New Jersey Division of Fish and Wildlife

Parks and Forestry
State law enforcement agencies of New Jersey
Nature conservation in the United States
Environmental agencies in the United States
State wildlife and natural resource agencies of the United States